Platyarthrus is a genus of woodlice in the family Platyarthridae. There are more than 30 described species in Platyarthrus.

Species
These 39 species belong to the genus Platyarthrus:

 Platyarthrus acropyga Chopra, 1924
 Platyarthrus adonis Verhoeff, 1941
 Platyarthrus aiasensis Legrand, 1954
 Platyarthrus almanus Verhoeff, 1949
 Platyarthrus alticolus Taiti & Checcucci, 2009
 Platyarthrus armenicus Borutzky, 1976
 Platyarthrus atanassovi Verhoeff, 1936
 Platyarthrus beieri Strouhal, 1955
 Platyarthrus briani Verhoeff, 1931
 Platyarthrus caudatus Aubert & Dollfus, 1890
 Platyarthrus codinai Arcangeli, 1924
 Platyarthrus coronatus Radu, 1960
 Platyarthrus corsicus Taiti & Ferrara, 1996
 Platyarthrus costulatus Verhoeff, 1908
 Platyarthrus dalmaticus Verhoeff, 1908
 Platyarthrus dobrogicus Radu, 1951
 Platyarthrus dollfusi Verhoeff, 1901
 Platyarthrus esterelanus Verhoeff, 1931
 Platyarthrus haplophthalmoides Arcangeli, 1932
 Platyarthrus hoffmannseggi Brandt, 1833
 Platyarthrus hoffmannseggii Brandt, 1833 (ant woodlouse)
 Platyarthrus inquilinus Verhoeff, 1949
 Platyarthrus kislarensis Verhoeff, 1941
 Platyarthrus kosswigii Verhoeff, 1949
 Platyarthrus lerinensis Vandel, 1957
 Platyarthrus lindbergi Vandel, 1958
 Platyarthrus luppovae Borutzky, 1953
 Platyarthrus maderensis Vandel, 1960
 Platyarthrus mesasiaticus Borutzkii, 1976
 Platyarthrus messorum Verhoeff, 1936
 Platyarthrus myrmicidarum Verhoeff, 1941
 Platyarthrus ocellatus Borutzky, 1953
 Platyarthrus parisii Arcangeli, 1931
 Platyarthrus reticulatus Radu, 1960
 Platyarthrus schoblii Budde-Lund, 1885
 Platyarthrus schoebli Budde-Lund, 1879
 Platyarthrus simoni Dollfus, 1893
 Platyarthrus sorrentinus Verhoeff, 1931
 Platyarthrus stadleri Karaman, 1961

References

Isopoda
Articles created by Qbugbot